Eric Saubert (born May 9, 1994) is an American football tight end for the Miami Dolphins of the National Football League (NFL). He played college football at Drake, and was drafted by the Atlanta Falcons in the fifth round of the 2017 NFL Draft.

Professional career
On December 5, 2016, it was announced that Saubert had accepted an invitation to play in the 2017 East–West Shrine Game. He impressed scouts and analysts throughout practices for the Shrine Game, displaying his athleticism, receiving ability, and received praises from multiple media members, including NFL analyst Mike Mayock. On January 21, 2017, Saubert played in the East–West Shrine Game and was part of an East team that lost 10–3 to the West. Unfortunately, he was unable to record a reception although he was targeted twice. On January 26, 2017, it was announced that Saubert would be a late addition to play in the 2017 Senior Bowl. He Attended two days later and was a part of Cleveland Browns' head coach Hue Jackson's South team that defeated the North 16–15. He was unable to record a reception with top draft prospects O. J. Howard, David Njoku, and Gerald Everett on his team and only having a day of practice. Saubert was one of 19 collegiate tight ends to receive an invitation to the NFL Scouting Combine in Indianapolis, Indiana. He tied for second amongst his position group in the bench press, fifth in the broad jump, and eighth in the vertical jump and opted to only perform those drills. On March 28, 2017, Saubert attended Iowa State's pro day and performed all of the combine drills and positional drills. He ran receiving drills with Cincinnati Bengals' tight ends coach Jonathan Hayes for the 33 team representatives and scouts who attended from 22 NFL teams. At the conclusion of the pre-draft process, Saubert was projected to be a fifth or sixth round pick by NFL draft experts and scouts. He was ranked the 12th best tight end prospect in the draft by CBS Sports and was ranked the 13th best tight end by NFLDraftScout.com.

Atlanta Falcons
The Atlanta Falcons selected Saubert in the fifth round (174th overall) of the 2017 NFL Draft. He was the first player selected from Drake since Pat Dunsmore was selected in the fourth round (183rd overall) of the 1983 NFL Draft. Saubert was the 20th player drafted in Drake University history and the 12th tight end drafted in 2017.
On May 11, 2017, the Atlanta Falcons signed Saubert to a four-year, $2.62 million contract that includes a signing bonus of $227,388.

With the departure of Jacob Tamme in free agency, Saubert competed for the starting tight end job throughout training camp, against Austin Hooper and Levine Toilolo. Head coach Dan Quinn named him the third string tight end to begin the regular season.

He made his professional regular season debut in the Atlanta Falcons' season-opening 23–17 victory at the Chicago Bears. He played in 14 games his rookie year but did not record any statistics.  Saubert had five catches for 48 yards (9.6 yards per catch) in 2018 as he saw action in all 16 games, including one start.

New England Patriots
On August 12, 2019, Saubert was traded to the New England Patriots for a conditional seventh-round draft pick in the 2020 NFL Draft. He was released during final roster cuts on August 31, 2019.

Oakland Raiders
Saubert signed with the Oakland Raiders' practice squad on September 1, 2019.

Chicago Bears
On November 30, 2019, Saubert was signed by the Chicago Bears off the Raiders practice squad. He caught two passes for 21 yards during the 2019 season.

Saubert was placed on the reserve/COVID-19 list by the Bears on July 29, 2020, and activated from the list five days later. He was waived by the team on September 16, 2020.

Jacksonville Jaguars
On September 19, 2020, Saubert was signed to the Jacksonville Jaguars practice squad. He was elevated to the active roster on October 24 for the team's week 7 game against the Los Angeles Chargers, and reverted to the practice squad after the game. He was signed to the active roster on November 21, 2020.

Denver Broncos
Saubert signed with the Denver Broncos on May 3, 2021. He made the active roster as the third TE on the depth chart and recorded one catch for 7 yards in Week 1 against the New York Giants. After posting just a single catch in Week 2 and no stats in Weeks 3-5, Saubert had a career best day in the Week 6 loss to the Las Vegas Raiders with 3 catches for 27 yards and an onside kick recovery. He caught the first touchdown pass of his career in the week 12 win against the Chargers.

On May 4, 2022, Saubert re-signed with the Broncos.

Miami Dolphins
On March 17, 2023, Saubert signed a one-year contract with the Miami Dolphins.

References

External links
Drake Bulldogs bio

1994 births
Living people
American football tight ends
Atlanta Falcons players
Chicago Bears players
Denver Broncos players
Drake Bulldogs football players
Jacksonville Jaguars players
Miami Dolphins players
New England Patriots players
Oakland Raiders players
People from Hoffman Estates, Illinois
Players of American football from Illinois
Sportspeople from Cook County, Illinois
Sportspeople from Kane County, Illinois